Chloroclystis ruptiscripta is a moth in the family Geometridae. It was described by Warren in 1904. It is found on the Philippines (Luzon) and in New Guinea.

The forewings are pale green with brownish markings, edged or varied with fuscous.

References

External links

Moths described in 1904
ruptiscripta